During the 1946-1947 Associazione Calcio Torino competed in Serie A.

Summary
After winning the championship last season, the team clinched again the title with a great performance in the second part of the season with a format of sole group. Valentino Mazzola scored a massive 29 goals to help Torino reach a back-to-back championship.

The wounds of war were healing and football returned to a single-round system. The league, due to the immediate difficulties to find the sixteen best teams, was played with a huge tournament of twenty teams, then occupying 38 days, from September to July 1947. Torino did not make substantial changes to its team, but had strengthened the park of players. Along with the return of Romeo Menti, came the midfielder Danilo Martelli from Brescia, the back-stopper Francesco Rosetta of Novara, the goalkeeper Dante Piani, the Vercellese Guido Tieghi.

From the 21st round the Granata returned to the lead, gradually strengthening their position and subsequently winning the tournament, with a ten-point lead over Juventus. Torino, after a last misstep with Sampdoria (the only team in the tournament to take away three points out of four from Torino) put together a sixteen match unbeaten run, of which fourteen were victories, beginning with the derby won by Guglielmo Gabetto, to go to other successes such as the five goals against Inter and Atalanta, the six against Vicenza, Genoa and Milan. That attack ended with 104 goals scored, an average of nearly three per game, and with Valentino Mazzola Serie A top-scorer.

Squad 
Source:

 (Captain)

Transfers

Competitions

Serie A

League table

Matches

Statistics 
Source:

Squad statistics

Players statistics

Appearances
25.Valerio Bacigalupo 
38.Aldo Ballarin  
27.Eusebio Castigliano 
34.Pietro Ferraris  
35.Guglielmo Gabetto 
35.Giuseppe Grezar 
30.Ezio Loik  
33.Virgilio Maroso  
17.Danilo Martelli  
38.Valentino Mazzola  
14.Romeo Menti  
29.Franco Ossola  
13.Dante Piani  
34.Mario Rigamonti  
13.Francesco Rosetta 
3.Guido Tieghi

Goalscorers
29.Valentino Mazzola 
19.Guglielmo Gabetto 
13.Franco Ossola 
12.Ezio Loik 
8.Eusebio Castigliano 
8.Pietro Ferraris  
4.Giuseppe Grezar  
1.Danilo Martelli  
6.Romeo Menti  
2.Guido Tieghi

See also
 Grande Torino

References

External links
 
 

Torino F.C. seasons
Torino
Italian football championship-winning seasons